| tries ={{#expr: 
 + 4 + 3 + 3
 + 0 + 5 + 1
 + 3 + 3 + 3
}}
| top point scorer    = Luciano Orquera (Italy A)(55 points)
| top try scorer      = Cătălin Fercu (Romania)Bryan Rennie (Scotland A)Joaquín Tuculet (Argentina Jaguars)(2 tries)
| venue               = 
| attendance2         = 
| champions           = 
| count               = 1
| runner-up           = 
| website             = IRB Nations Cup
| previous year       = 2009
| previous tournament = 2009 IRB Nations Cup
| next year           = 2011
| next tournament     = 2011 IRB Nations Cup
}}
The 2010 IRB Nations Cup was the fifth edition of the international rugby union tournament, a competition created by the International Rugby Board.  It pits the "A" Teams of the stronger (Tier 1) rugby nations (Argentina Jaguars, Italy A and Scotland A) against some of the Tier 2 and 3 nations (Romania, Namibia and Georgia).

For the fourth consecutive year the event was held in Bucharest, Romania.  Scotland A returned to defend their title, but Namibia were the overall winners of the tournament.

The competition format was a modified round-robin whereby each team played 3 of the other 5 teams.  The competition was played over three match days, with three matches played consecutively on each day.

Final standings

Fixtures

Round 1
IRB Reports

Round 2
IRB Reports

Round 3
IRB Reports

Top scorers

Top points scorers

Source: irb.com

Top try scorers

Source: irb.com

See also 

2010 IRB Pacific Nations Cup

References

External links
IRB Overview
IRB Fixtures/Results
IRB Standings

2010
2010 rugby union tournaments for national teams
International rugby union competitions hosted by Romania
2009–10 in Romanian rugby union
2009–10 in Italian rugby union
2009–10 in Scottish rugby union
2010 in Argentine rugby union
rugby union
2010 in Georgian sport
Sport in Bucharest
June 2010 sports events in Europe